A Closed Book is a short novel by Gilbert Adair, published in 2000.

The book starts with a slightly awkward meeting between a crotchety blind author and a sighted interviewee he seeks to employ as his assistant.

The narrative is presented almost entirely through dialogue between the two men, punctuated by fragments of the writer's diary. As the two men's relationship develops it becomes clear that both have something to hide.

A film based on the novel was released in 2010.

References

1999 British novels
Novels by Gilbert Adair
Novels about writers
British novels adapted into films
Faber and Faber books